Lemi Berhanu Hayle, also known as Berhanu Lemi, (Amharic: ለሚ ብርሃኑ ኃይሌ ; born 13 September 1994) is an Ethiopian long-distance runner who specialises in the marathon. He competed in the marathon event at the 2015 World Championships in Athletics in Beijing, China, placing 15th. His personal best of 2:04:33 hours, set in 2015, ranks him in the world's top 15 athletes for the distance (as of 2016). In April 2016, he won the Boston Marathon.

Career
Lemi ran his debut marathon in 2014 and his time of 2:10:40 hours made him the winner at the Zürich Marathon. The following year he entered the Dubai Marathon and surprised the high quality field by winning in a time of 2:05:28 hours – five minutes faster than he had run before to beat Boston Marathon champion Lelisa Desisa and Chicago Marathon runner-up Feyisa Lilesa. The prize winnings of US$200,000 represented a significant change of fortunes for the athlete and he remarked "I really don’t know what I will do with it". He made it three consecutive wins at the distance by topping the podium at the Orlen Warsaw Marathon in 2:07:57 hours later that season.

After losing his winning streak on his international debut at the 2015 World Championships in Athletics, he returned to defend his Dubai title in 2016 and gave a strong effort with a personal best of 2:04:33 hours. However, he lost out in a sprint finish with Tesfaye Abera and finished in second place, nine seconds in arrears. Lemi won the 2016 Boston Marathon in a time of 2:12:45, confirming his place among the world's top distance runners.

International competitions

Circuit wins
Zürich Marathon: 2014
Dubai Marathon: 2015
Orlen Warsaw Marathon: 2015
Boston Marathon: 2016
Xiamen International Marathon: 2017
Hengshui Lake Marathon: 2018

References

External links
 

1994 births
Living people
Ethiopian male long-distance runners
Ethiopian male marathon runners
World Athletics Championships athletes for Ethiopia
Place of birth missing (living people)
Boston Marathon male winners